Herra Terra is an Electro-Rock group from Massachusetts, signed to Indie label The Mylene Sheath    Currently supporting their 2010 release; "Quiet Geist".

History 

Herra Terra was conceived by vocalist, John Paul Tonelli and guitarist, Gregg Kusumah-Atmadja. The duo released a 3-song EP in 2008 entitled “Organs For The Afterlife” with help from Boston-based musicians (Bad Rabbits, Irepress) and Sound Engineer, Mike ”Mo” Lapierre (Death Cab for Cutie, Brand New, Drop Kick Murphy's). Not being able to find a permanent fixture on drums, the band played as a two piece electronic act in the New England area until 2009, the band recruited Brad Caetano (Arms & Sleepers, Seneca, AM/PM). Ever since, the group has melded together and enhanced their electronic and live elements, adding Adrian Bettencourt Andrade on Bass.

Herra Terra has been an Official Showcasing Artist at both 2011 and 2012 SXSW Festivals.

Herra Terra has shared the stage with some outstanding artists such as: The White Mountains, Shiny Toy Guns, Piebald, Damone, Freeze Pop, Green Jelly, Appleseed Cast, Hot Rod Circuit, Chk Chk Chk (!!!), Bad Rabbits, Irepress, Semi Precious Weapons and many others.

Members 
John Tonelli - Vocals/Keys

Gregg Kusumah-Atmadja - Guitar/Keys

Adrian Bettencourt Andrade - Bass/Keys

Shawn Pelkey - Drums

References 

Musical groups established in 2006
American electronic rock musical groups
Musical groups from Massachusetts
American space rock musical groups